"Let Me Be Your Sugar Baby" is a song written by Artie Malvin.

The song inspired the Broadway musical, Sugar Babies, for which Malvin received a Tony Award nomination. This song also inspired the name for the iconic Sugar Babies candy that was originally developed in 1935.

References

20th-century songs
Year of song missing
Songs written by Artie Malvin